Nancy Sullivan may refer to:

 Nancy Sullivan (American actress) (born 1969), American actress, television host and screenwriter
 Nancy Sullivan (English actress) (born 1985), English actress and singer
 Nancy Sullivan (politician) (born 1949), American politician, Maine politician and schoolteacher
 Nancy Achin Sullivan (1959–2022), American politician, member of the Massachusetts Senate
 Nancy Sullivan (biologist), American cell biologist
 Nancy Benoit (1964–2007), formerly Sullivan, American professional wrestling valet and manager